Sascha Härtel (born 9 March 1999) is a German professional footballer who plays as a defender.

Career
Härtel made his professional debut for Erzgebirge Aue on 18 August 2018, starting in the first round of the 2018–19 DFB-Pokal against Bundesliga side Mainz 05. The match finished as a 3–1 home loss for Aue.

References

External links
 
 
 

1999 births
Living people
People from Erzgebirgskreis
Footballers from Saxony
German footballers
Association football defenders
FC Erzgebirge Aue players
Sportfreunde Lotte players
FSV Zwickau players
2. Bundesliga players
3. Liga players